Larin izbor is a Croatian telenovela created by Jelena Veljača and written by Tomislav Hrpka. The series premiered on September 4, 2011 on Nova TV. Doris Pinčić and Ivan Herceg are main protagonists, while Ecija Ojdanić, Filip Juričić, Jagoda Kumrić, Marija Karan and Janko Popović Volarić are villains/ antagonists, with primer cast of Marija Kohn and Frane Perišin.
In Pakistan, the show was broadcast on Urdu 1 retitled Lara Ki Kahani.

Synopsis
Lara Božić is a young and simple girl who lives and works in Split. Although an educated musician, she works as an assistant cook at a catering service. Owners of the catering service offer her work as a waitress at Zlatar family banquet. Zlatar family is an aristocratic family. At a party Lara meets Jakov Zlatar, a young, well-brought up young man from a respectable family. Jakov returned to Split after several years and his mother Nela had prepared a party in his honor. Jakov is not interested in the world that his mother and father try to impose, but he caught his eyes on a young girl. Jakov and Lara fall in love at first sight and spend the evening together. After a passionate night in the garden, Nela catches them and expellees Lara from the Zlatar compound. Because he failed to prevent the act of his mother, Jakov feels embarrassed and asks Lara for forgiveness.

Nela Zlatar is a proud woman obsessed with the image of the family and the continuation of esteemed lineage Zlatar. She is convinced that Lara approached Jakov only to enter their family and to destroy Jakov's career as a successful captain. Jakov needs to leave for work abroad but before his departure, he proposes Lara. The two get married. Jakov brings Lara back into the Zlatar house and tells everyone that Lara is now his legal wife. Lara's world starts to change dramatically. She is left to the mercy of Nela and Jakov's younger sister Nicole.

Seasons

Cast

Protagonists and supporting roles

Villains

Abandoned the series

Ratings
The show premiered on Sunday September 4, 2011 with domestic share of 11,9%. Its 50th episode was watched by a record-breaking 1,2 million viewers. It is the most-watched scripted show in Croatia, attracting more viewers that the national news, Dnevnik, which used to be an all-time ratings leader in Croatia.
The title track translated into Arabic and has achieved success in Egypt and Dubai (Samo ljubav ostaje-https://www.youtube.com/watch?v=pld3D1xMRsw).

Broadcasting

References

External links

2011 telenovelas
2011 Croatian television series debuts
2013 Croatian television series endings
Croatian television soap operas
2010s Croatian television series
Fictional Croatian people
Television shows set in Croatia
Nova TV (Croatia) original programming